The first Progressive Conservative Party of Canada leadership election was held in 1927, when the party was called the Conservative Party. Prior to then the party's leader was chosen by the caucus or in several cases by the Governor General of Canada designating a Conservative MP or Senator to form a government after the retirement or death of an incumbent Conservative Prime Minister.

There have been two permanent leaders since 1927 who were not chosen by a leadership convention. Arthur Meighen agreed to serve a second term as leader in 1941 on condition that he would not have to contest the position. The party agreed since the party was desperate for a leader of Meighen's stature. Jean Charest was one of only two Progressive Conservative Members of Parliament returned in the 1993 election and was appointed leader by the party's executive with the decision later being affirmed at a regular party convention two years later. The Conservative Party became the Progressive Conservative Party in 1942.

All leadership conventions were delegated conventions, except in 1998 when a one member, one vote process was used in which each riding was allocated 100 points which were distributed among candidates by proportionally. For the 2003 leadership election, the party reverted to use of a delegated convention, ostensibly because of the cost of using a one member, one vote process (though it has been argued that the party feared that use of one member, one vote would make an outside takeover of the party easier due to a decline in membership). In 2003, the party merged with the Canadian Alliance to form a new Conservative Party of Canada. This party adopted the one member, one vote process the Tories had used in 1998.

Note on tables: Green box indicates winner. Pink box indicates candidate eliminated from ballot for receiving the fewest votes. Blue box indicates candidate withdrew from balloting.

1927 Conservative leadership convention

Held in Winnipeg, Manitoba on October 11, 1927.

George Halsey Perley, H. H. Stevens, John Allister Currie, John Baxter, Howard Ferguson, Edgar Nelson Rhodes, and outgoing leader Arthur Meighen were all nominated but declined to run.

1938 Conservative leadership convention

Held in Ottawa, Ontario on July 7, 1938.

Manion lost his seat in the 1940 federal election and R.B. Hanson became interim leader. In November 1941 a national conference of the party voted against having a leadership convention and instead appointed Arthur Meighen as the party's wartime leader. Meighen was defeated in a 1942 by-election and resigned.

1942 Progressive Conservative leadership convention

Held in Winnipeg, Manitoba on December 11, 1942.

1948 Progressive Conservative leadership convention

Held in Ottawa, Ontario on October 2, 1948.

Wilfrid Garfield Case announced his candidacy but withdrew before the convention to support Drew.

1956 Progressive Conservative leadership convention

Held in Ottawa, Ontario on December 14, 1956.

1967 Progressive Conservative leadership convention

The 1967 leadership convention was held in Toronto, Ontario on September 9, 1967.

1976 Progressive Conservative leadership convention

The 1976 leadership convention was held in Ottawa, Ontario on February 22, 1976.

Richard Quittenton withdrew from the race before the convention began.

1983 Progressive Conservative leadership convention

The 1983 leadership convention was held in Ottawa, Ontario on June 11, 1983.

1993 leadership convention results

The 1993 leadership convention was held in Ottawa, Ontario on June 13, 1993.

1995 Progressive Conservative leadership convention
The 1995 leadership convention was held at the Palais des congrès de Gatineau in Hull, Quebec on April 29, 1995, to ratify Jean Charest as leader. Charest had been named interim leader following the 1993 federal election (and Kim Campbell's resignation as party leader), which reduced the Progressive Conservatives to only two seats, with Charest being the only cabinet minister to win re-election.

1998 Progressive Conservative leadership election

First ballot was conducted October 24, 1998; second ballot was conducted November 14, 1998.

The 1998 election used a point system that allocated 100 points to each riding, regardless of the number of votes cast in the riding. The candidate who won a majority of points (not necessarily a majority of voters) would win the leadership. All party members were eligible to cast a vote. The 100-point-per-riding system was again used by the Conservative Party of Canada in its 2004 leadership race.

2003 Progressive Conservative leadership convention

The 2003 leadership convention was held in Toronto, Ontario on May 31, 2003.

Two other candidates had participated in the race. Quebec MP André Bachand withdrew his candidacy from the race due to financial concerns and backed Peter MacKay. Former Cabinet Minister and Quebec MP Heward Grafftey also withdrew his candidacy from the race due to health concerns.

See also
Conservative Party of Canada leadership elections

References

Parliament of Canada website

 
Progressive Conservative Party of Canada leadership elections